Xujiajing is a subdistrict and the seat of Lingling District in Yongzhou Prefecture-level City, Hunan, China. The subdistrict is located in the north-central portion of Lingling District, it is historically the former Chengbei Subdistrict formed in January 1980 and was renamed to present name in 1995.

References

Lingling District
Subdistricts of Hunan
County seats in Hunan